USS Perry may refer to the following United States Navy ships that are named for Oliver Hazard Perry:

 , a sailing brig 1843–1865.
 , an armed side wheel ferry built in 1859 and purchased by the US Navy 2 October 1861
 ,  1900–1919.
 , a  converted into a high speed minesweeper and redesignated DMS-17 effective 19 November 1940.  Served 1921–1944; sunk in Battle of Peleliu.
 , was a  1945–1970.
 , a guided-missile frigate 1976–1997

See also
 , a Liberty ship.  See List of Liberty ships (M–R).
 
 , a 
 , a revenue cutter in service from 1865 through 1883.
 , a revenue cutter in service from 1884 through 1910.

United States Navy ship names